Niels Bruynseels (born 5 December 1983) is a Belgian show jumping competitor. He represented Belgium at the 2020 Summer Olympics in Tokyo 2021, competing in individual jumping.

References

External links
 
 
 

 

1983 births
Living people
Belgian male equestrians
Equestrians at the 2020 Summer Olympics
Olympic equestrians of Belgium
Belgian show jumping riders